William Creek Airport  is located at William Creek, South Australia.

See also
 List of airports in South Australia

References

Airports in South Australia
Far North (South Australia)